Pilgrim of Love, is a 1954 Italian comedy film directed by Andrea Forzano and starring Sophia Loren.

Plot 
Two suitors fight over Sophia Loren (as Giulietta) in a gambling house run by Alda Mangini (as Madame Dalia).

Cast 

 Sophia Loren as Giulietta / Beppina Delli Colli 
 Alda Mangini as Madame Dalia

References

External links

Italian comedy films
1954 comedy films
1954 films
Films directed by Andrea Forzano
1950s French films
1950s Italian films